This is a list of permanent delegates to the National Council of Provinces (NCOP) of the 26th South African Parliament from 2014 to 2019.

Composition

Permanent delegates

References
 

 
Parliament of South Africa